During the financial crisis of 2007–2008, several banks, including the UK's Northern Rock and the U.S. investment banks Bear Stearns and Lehman Brothers, suffered a liquidity crisis, due to their over-reliance on short-term wholesale funding from the interbank lending market. As a result, the G20 launched an overhaul of banking regulation known as Basel III. In addition to changes in capital requirements, Basel III also contains two entirely new liquidity requirements: the net stable funding ratio (NSFR) and the liquidity coverage ratio (LCR). 

On October 31, 2014, the Basel Committee on Banking Supervision issued its final Net Stable Funding Ratio (it was initially proposed in 2010 and re-proposed in January 2014). Both ratios are landmark requirements: it is planned that they will apply to all banks worldwide if they are engaged in international banking.

Background
The net stable funding ratio has been proposed within Basel III, the new set of capital and liquidity requirements for banks, which will over time replace Basel II. Basel III has been prepared within the Basel Committee on Banking Supervision of the Bank for International Settlements. Various components of Basel III are being implemented in different jurisdictions and Basel committee reports progress on the state of implementation through its Regulatory Consistency Assessment Programme ("RCAP") which is published on a semi-annual basis.

Description 
Net Stable Funding ratio seeks to calculate the proportion of Available Stable Funding ("ASF") via the liabilities over Required Stable Funding ("RSF") for the assets.

 Sources of Available Stable funding includes: customer deposits, long-term wholesale funding (from the interbank lending market), and equity.
 "Stable funding" excludes short-term wholesale funding (also from the interbank lending market).

These components of stable funding are not equally weighted: see page 21 and 22 of the Consultative Document dated December 2009 for the detailed weights.

Some of the weights for longer term or "structural term assets" are as follows:
 100% of loans longer than one year;
 95% of demand deposits and retail or small business deposits with maturities of less than one year;
 90% of less stable demand and term deposits by retail and small businesses;
 50% of loans to corporate clients and governments with a remaining life shorter than one year;
 0% of all other liabilities and equities.

Formula

Implementation
As the Basel Committee on Banking Supervision (BCBS) does not have the power to issue legally binding regulation, the Basel III standards have to be implemented by national authorities. Consequently, there are differences among countries with respect to both content and timing.

The NSFR has become a minimum standard by 1 January 2018. However, implementation has been delayed in many countries. Less than half of the G20 members had implemented the rules by 2018. Among those that lag behind are the US, the EU, Switzerland and Japan. The compliant countries include Australia, Brazil, China, Indonesia and Russia. 

Over time NSFR calibration will be reviewed as proposals are developed and industry standards implemented.

Off-balance sheet categories
As mentioned above, off-balance sheet categories are also weighted as they contribute to both the assets and liabilities. This is best explained by the potential for contingent calls on funding liquidity (revocable and irrevocable line of credit and liquidity facilities to clients). Therefore, once the standard is in place, off-balance sheet commitments will need to be funded, with the stable funding.

This may help prevent the excessive use of the shadow banking system, including special purpose entity and structured investment vehicle, as these conduits often benefit from liquidity facilities (so-called back-stop facilities) granted by the bank which created them.

References

"FSA and the Net Stable Funding Ratio" 17 March 2010

Banking
Bank regulation
Stress tests (financial)